Coelognathus radiatus, commonly known as the radiated ratsnake, copperhead rat snake, or copper-headed trinket snake, is a nonvenomous species of colubrid snake.

Temperament 
These snakes are usually defensive in nature which makes it hard to catch or control them.

Common names 
 German: Strahlennatter
 English:
 Copperhead racer
 Copperhead rat snake
 Radiated rat snake
 Copper-headed trinket snake
 Thai: งูทางมะพร้าว, ngu taang mapao
 Myanmar: ငန်းစောင်း
 Bengali (Bangladesh): দুধরাজ (Dudhraj), আরবালি সাপ (Arbali sap)

Distribution
Indonesia (Sumatra, Bangka, Borneo/Kalimantan, Java), Bali
Malaysia and Brunei (Malaya and East Malaysia); Borneo,
Singapore Island,
Burma (Myanmar),
Thailand (including Phuket), Koh Phangan

Laos, Cambodia, Vietnam,
Japan (Ryukyu Islands),
India (Assam, Arunachal Pradesh (Miao - Changlang district, Chessa, Chimpu, Itanagar - Papum Pare district) [A. Captain, pers. comm.]),
Bangladesh, Nepal,
South China (Fujian, Yunnan, Guangxi, Guangdong, Hong Kong),
Nepal

Type locality: Java

References

Sources

 Barbour, Thomas (1912). Some Chinese Vertebrates: Amphibia and Reptilia. Memoirs of the Museum of Comparative. Zoölogy 40 (4): 125-136
 Cantor, T. E. (1839). Spicilegium serpentium indicorum [part 1]. Proc. Zool. Soc. London 1839: 31-34
 Chan-ard, T.; Grossmann, W.; Gumprecht, A. & Schulz, K. D. (1999). Amphibians and reptiles of peninsular Malaysia and Thailand - an illustrated checklist. [bilingual English and German]. Bushmaster Publications, Würselen, Germany, 240 pp.
 Cox, Merel J.; Van Dijk, Peter Paul; Jarujin Nabhitabhata & Thirakhupt, Kumthorn (1998). A Photographic Guide to Snakes and Other Reptiles of Peninsular Malaysia, Singapore and Thailand. Ralph Curtis Publishing, 144 pp.
 David, P. & Vogel, G. (1996). The snakes of Sumatra. An annotated checklist and key with natural history notes. Bücher Kreth, Frankfurt/M.
 Duméril, ANDRÉ MARIE CONSTANT (1853). Prodrome de la classification des reptiles ophidiens. Mém. Acad. Sci., Paris, 23: 399-536
 Gumprecht, A. (2003). Anmerkungen zu den Chinesischen Kletternattern der Gattung Elaphe (sensu lato) Fitzinger 1833. Reptilia (Münster) 8 (6): 37-41
 Helfenberger, Notker (2001). Phylogenetic relationship of Old World Ratsnakes based on visceral organ topography, osteology, and allozyme variation. Russ. J. Herpetol. (Suppl.), 56 pp.
 Schmidt, D. (1983). Die Strahlennatter, Elaphe radiata (Schlegel). Elaphe 1983 (3): 33-36
 Schulz, Klaus-Dieter (1996). A monograph of the colubrid snakes of the genus Elaphe Fitzinger. Koeltz Scientific Books, 439 pp.
 Utiger, Urs, Notker Helfenberger, Beat Schätti, Catherine Schmidt, Markus Ruf and Vincent Ziswiler (2002). Molecular systematics and phylogeny of Old World and New World ratsnakes, Elaphe Auct., and related genera (Reptilia, Squamata, Colubridae). Russ. J. Herpetol. 9 (2): 105–124.

Rat snakes
Reptiles described in 1827
Reptiles of India
Snakes of Indonesia
Snakes of Myanmar
Snakes of Thailand
Snakes of China
Reptiles of Nepal